Taylor Duryea (born 24 April 1991) is an Australian rules footballer who plays for the Western Bulldogs in the Australian Football League (AFL). Duryea initially played with Wahgunyah in the Coreen & District Football League, winning back to back Coreen & DFL Thirds best and fairest awards in 2004 and 2005.

AFL career

Hawthorn career (2010–2018) 
Duryea was drafted with No. 69 in the 2009 AFL draft, being a fifth round selection.

Tried as a small forward when he first arrived at Hawthorn, he has switched to the backline and has carried out a similar playmaking role to Matt Suckling and Brent Guerra. A knee injury to Suckling helped open up an opportunity for Duryea to debut against Collingwood in Round 3 of the 2013 AFL season.

Duryea played 18 games in 2013 and won the "Best first year player" award.

Duryea played 23 of a possible 25 matches in 2014. With the retirement of Brent Guerra at the end of last season, a spot opened up for the young Hawk. He was noted for his skills in rebound defence. He showed good form throughout the 2014 finals series and earned himself a premiership medal.

On 9 October 2017, Duryea signed a one–year deal to remain at the club until the end of 2018. On 16 October 2018, Duryea was traded to the Western Bulldogs.

Duryea re-signed with the Bulldogs for one year on 19 November 2020.

Statistics
Updated to the end of round 14, 2022.

|-
| 2010 ||  || 41
| 0 || — || — || — || — || — || — || — || — || — || — || — || — || — || — || 0
|-
| 2011 ||  || 41
| 0 || — || — || — || — || — || — || — || — || — || — || — || — || — || — || 0
|-
| 2012 ||  || 41
| 0 || — || — || — || — || — || — || — || — || — || — || — || — || — || — || 0
|-
| 2013 ||  || 41
| 18 || 0 || 3 || 160 || 83 || 243 || 72 || 45 || 0.0 || 0.2 || 8.9 || 4.6 || 13.5 || 4.0 || 2.5 || 0
|-
| bgcolor=F0E68C | 2014# ||  || 8
| 23 || 6 || 2 || 216 || 132 || 348 || 102 || 41 || 0.3 || 0.1 || 9.4 || 5.7 || 15.1 || 4.4 || 1.8 || 0
|-
| bgcolor=F0E68C | 2015# ||  || 8
| 22 || 6 || 2 || 281 || 111 || 392 || 156 || 47 || 0.3 || 0.1 || 12.8 || 5.1 || 17.8 || 7.1 || 2.1 || 0
|-
| 2016 ||  || 8
| 23 || 2 || 4 || 267 || 119 || 386 || 127 || 44 || 0.1 || 0.2 || 11.6 || 5.2 || 16.8 || 5.5 || 1.9 || 0
|-
| 2017 ||  || 8
| 15 || 6 || 9 || 130 || 86 || 216 || 75 || 41 || 0.4 || 0.6 || 8.7 || 5.7 || 14.4 || 5.0 || 2.7 || 0
|-
| 2018 ||  || 8
| 17 || 1 || 7 || 159 || 100 || 259 || 79 || 33 || 0.1 || 0.4 || 9.4 || 5.9 || 15.2 || 4.6 || 1.9 || 0
|-
| 2019 ||  || 15
| 14 || 2 || 1 || 193 || 72 || 265 || 82 || 28 || 0.1 || 0.1 || 13.8 || 5.1 || 18.9 || 5.9 || 2.0 || 0
|-
| 2020 ||  || 15
| 3 || 0 || 0 || 35 || 12 || 47 || 13 || 9 || 0.0 || 0.0 || 11.7 || 4.0 || 15.7 || 4.3 || 3.0 || 0
|-
| 2021 ||  || 15
| 25 || 1 || 0 || 281 || 156 || 437 || 132 || 48 || 0.0 || 0.0 || 11.2 || 6.2 || 17.5 || 5.3 || 1.9 || 0
|-
| 2022 ||  || 15
| 11 || 1 || 0 || 96 || 50 || 146 || 65 || 13 || 0.1 || 0.0 || 8.7 || 4.5 || 13.3 || 5.9 || 1.2 || 
|- class="sortbottom"
! colspan=3| Career
! 171 !! 25 !! 28 !! 1818 !! 921 !! 2739 !! 903 !! 349 !! 0.1 !! 0.2 !! 10.6 !! 5.4 !! 16.0 !! 5.3 !! 2.0 !! 0
|}

Notes

Honours and achievements
Team
 2× AFL premiership player: 2014, 2015
 Minor premiership: 2013
 VFL premiership player: 2013
 Minor premiership: 2015

Individual
  best clubman: 2018
  coaches award: 2021
  best first year player (debut season): 2013
 Box Hill All-Stars team (1999–2019)

References

External links

 
 

Living people
1991 births
Hawthorn Football Club players
Hawthorn Football Club Premiership players
Box Hill Football Club players
Murray Bushrangers players
Australian rules footballers from Victoria (Australia)
Western Bulldogs players
Two-time VFL/AFL Premiership players